Lieutenant General Andrei Alekseyevich Ravkov (born on 25 June 1967 in Revyaki, Vitebsk Region) is a Belarusian General and military leader who last served as the State Secretary of the Security Council of Belarus in 2020.

Early life and career
In 1984, he graduated from Minsk Suvorov Military School. In 1988, he graduated with honors from the Moscow Higher Military Command School. He worked his way from the commander of the platoon to commander of the battalion. In 1999, he graduated with a gold medal from the Command and Staff Department of the Military Academy of Belarus. In 2005, he graduated with honours from the Military Academy of the General Staff of the Armed Forces of the Russian Federation and was appointed commander of the 103rd Separate Guards Mobile Brigade. From 2006 to 2012 he served as Chief of the Operations Department and concurrently as Deputy Chief of Staff of the Western Operational Command. On 16 November 2012, he became Commander of the North Western Operational Command. That year, he was elected to the Minsk regional council of deputies from Borisov. By order of President Alexander Lukashenko on 24 November 2014, he was appointed to the post of Minister of Defence.

Activities as Minister of Defense
In the run-up to the 2015 Minsk Victory Day Parade, Ravkov ordered the changing of the open top inspection vehicle used on Victors Avenue from the traditional ZIL-41044 to the Hongqi L5, which is an official state car in China. In 2017, after the death of a conscript soldier Alexander Korzhich due to repeated hazing, he reaffirmed his support in the conscription system while conceding that it needed changes due to the lack of recruits. In late September 2017, Ravkov presided over the Zapad 2017 exercise with Russia. He announced in November 2018 that the national defence plan for 2019 will be adjusted to come in line with the most recent military doctrine.

In June 2019, he announced the entry of a bill in the House of Representatives, the largest of its provisions being a mechanism that institutes mandatory military service. In the substantiation of the law's draft, authored by Ravkov, the need to for this is justified by the fact that the chairmen of local executive authorities and their deputies head their own territorial defense zones. On 28 June 2019, the House of Representatives passed this bill in second reading. After the law enters into force, eligible graduates of higher educational institutions such as Belarusian State University are required to engage in military service immediately and will not be able to continue their postgraduate studies. He was dismissed in January 2020, succeeding Stanislav Zas as Secretary of the Security Council of Belarus.

Security Council chief
He was dismissed on 3 September 2020, being succeeded by the Chairman of the KGB, Valery Vakulchik.

Post-military
On 19 November, he was appointed as the Ambassador to Azerbaijan. On 16 February 2021, he presented his credentials to President Ilham Aliyev.

International sanctions
In August 2020, Ravkov was put under sanctions by Estonia, Latvia and Lithuania over his role in suppressing the 2020 Belarusian protests. On 6 November 2020, he was sanctioned by the European Union, the United Kingdom, and Canada. On 24 November, Iceland, Liechtenstein, Norway, North Macedonia, Montenegro and Albania aligned themselves with the November EU sanctions against 15 Belarusian individuals, while Switzerland did the same on 11 December.

Dates of rank

See also
Security Council of Belarus

References

External links
Defense Ministry's official biography
Belta biography

1967 births
People from Beshankovichy District
Belarusian generals
Defence ministers of Belarus
Government of Belarus
Living people
Minsk Suvorov Military School alumni
Military Academy of the General Staff of the Armed Forces of Russia alumni